Plymouth Rock is the traditional site of disembarkation of the Mayflower Pilgrims who founded Plymouth Colony in December 1620. The Pilgrims did not refer to Plymouth Rock in any of their writings; the first known written reference to the rock dates to 1715 when it was described in the town boundary records as "a great rock." The first documented claim that Plymouth Rock was the landing place of the Pilgrims was made by 94-year-old Thomas Faunce in 1741, 121 years after the Pilgrims arrived in Plymouth.

In 1774, the rock broke in half during an attempt to haul it to Town Square in Plymouth. One portion remained in Town Square and was moved to Pilgrim Hall Museum in 1834. It was rejoined with the other portion of the rock, which was still at its original site on the shore of Plymouth Harbor, in 1880. The date 1620 was inscribed at that time. The rock is now ensconced beneath a granite canopy.

History

Early identification
The two most significant primary sources on the founding of Plymouth Colony are Edward Winslow's 1622 Mourt's Relation and Bradford's 1630–1651 history Of Plymouth Plantation, and neither refers to Plymouth Rock. The rock first attracted public attention in 1741 when the residents of Plymouth began plans to build a wharf which would bury it. Before construction began, a 94-year-old church elder named Thomas Faunce declared that the boulder was the landing place of the Mayflower Pilgrims. He asked to be brought to the rock to say a farewell. According to Plymouth historian James Thacher:

Faunce's father had arrived in the colony aboard the ship Anne in 1623, just two years after the Mayflower landing, and Elder Faunce was born in 1647, when many of the Mayflower Pilgrims were still living, so his assertion made a strong impression on the people of Plymouth. The wharf was built but the rock left intact, the top portion protruding from the dirt so as to be visible to curious visitors.

More recent generations have questioned Faunce's assertion, alleging that he invented the story or did not have the correct facts, given that he was not an eyewitness to the event. Journalist Bill Bryson, for example, wrote, "The one thing the Pilgrims certainly did not do was step ashore on Plymouth Rock", arguing that the boulder would have made an impractical landing spot. Others have pointed out that the Pilgrims landed at Provincetown to explore Cape Cod more than a month before they arrived in Plymouth harbor, which lessens the significance of where they set foot in Plymouth. In 1851, a group of Cape Cod residents formed the Cape Cod Association for the purpose of promoting Provincetown as the site of the original Pilgrim landing. Such efforts eventually led to the construction of the Pilgrim Monument in Provincetown, which was completed in 1910.

Movements
Col. Theophilus Cotton (son of Josiah Cotton, a Plymouth magistrate) and the townspeople of Plymouth decided to move the rock in 1774. It was split into two parts, with the bottom portion left behind at the wharf and the top portion relocated to the town's meeting house.

Captain William Coit wrote in The Pennsylvania Journal of November 29, 1775, that he brought captive British sailors ashore "upon the same rock our ancestors first trod."

A large portion of the rock was relocated from Plymouth's meetinghouse to Pilgrim Hall in 1834. In 1859, the Pilgrim Society began building a Victorian canopy designed by Hammett Billings at the wharf over the portion of the rock left there, which was completed in 1867. The Pilgrim Hall section of the rock was moved back to its original wharf location in 1880, rejoined to the remaining portion, and the date "1620" was carved into it.

In 1920, the rock was temporarily relocated so the old wharves could be removed and the waterfront landscaped to a design by architect Arthur Shurcliff, with a waterfront promenade behind a low seawall in such a way that, when the rock was returned to its original site, it would be at water level. The care of the rock was turned over to the Commonwealth of Massachusetts, and a new Roman Doric portico was constructed, designed by McKim, Mead and White for viewing the tide-washed rock protected by gratings.

During the rock's many journeys throughout the town of Plymouth, numerous pieces were taken, bought, and sold. Today approximately a third remains. Some documents indicate that tourists or souvenir hunters chipped it down, although no pieces have been noticeably removed since 1880. Today there are pieces in Pilgrim Hall Museum and in the Smithsonian's National Museum of American History.

A  piece of the Rock is set on a pedestal in the cloister of historic Plymouth Church of the Pilgrims in Brooklyn Heights, New York.  The church was formed by a merger of Plymouth Church and Church of the Pilgrims and was originally pastored by Henry Ward Beecher, brother of author Harriet Beecher Stowe.

In 1835, French author Alexis de Tocqueville wrote:

State park attraction
Today, Plymouth Rock is managed by the Department of Conservation and Recreation for the Commonwealth of Massachusetts as part of Pilgrim Memorial State Park. From April through November, Pilgrim Memorial is staffed by guides who inform visitors of the legend of Plymouth Rock.

Panorama

See also
 National Register of Historic Places listings in Plymouth County, Massachusetts

Citations

General and cited references 
 Arner, Robert, "Plymouth Rock Revisited: The Landing of the Pilgrim Fathers", Journal of American Culture 6, no. 4, Winter 1983, pp. 25–35.
 
 Davis, Samuel, “Notes on Plymouth”, Massachusetts Historical Society Collections, vol. 3, 2nd ser., 1815.
 McPhee, John, “Travels of the Rock”, The New Yorker, February 26, 1990, pp. 108–117.

External links

 Pilgrim Memorial State Park

American folklore
Glacial erratics of Massachusetts
History of North America
History of Plymouth County, Massachusetts
History of the Thirteen Colonies
Individual rocks
Landforms of Plymouth County, Massachusetts
Monuments and memorials to the Pilgrims
National Register of Historic Places in Plymouth County, Massachusetts
Plymouth Colony
Plymouth, Massachusetts
Symbols of Massachusetts
Tourist attractions in Plymouth County, Massachusetts